John Crawford (born Cleve Allen Richardson; September 13, 1920 – September 21, 2010) was an American actor. He appeared  in a 1961 episode of The Twilight Zone, called "A Hundred Yards Over the Rim", and in several Gunsmoke  episodes. He had a key role in the 1975 film Night Moves, a crime thriller starring Gene Hackman, and played the mayor of San Francisco in 1976's The Enforcer, the third Dirty Harry film featuring Clint Eastwood.

Life and career
Crawford was born in Colfax, Washington, and studied at the School of Drama at the University of Washington. In films from the 1940s, Crawford appeared in bit parts for many years before playing leads in several films in the United Kingdom in the late 1950s and early 1960s.

When he returned to the United States, he played supporting roles in several films but was more prolific on TV in character roles, in scores of series such as State Trooper (in the episode "The Last Stage Robbery"), Gunsmoke (14 episodes between 1959 and 1974), The Twilight Zone, Combat!, The Fugitive, Voyage to the Bottom of the Sea,  Wheels, The Dukes of Hazzard, The Incredible Hulk, The Time Tunnel, Mannix, Lost in Space, Star Trek, Mission: Impossible, Hogan's Heroes, The Rockford Files and most notably as  Sheriff Ep Bridges on CBS' The Waltons.

Crawford co-wrote the screenplay of the film The Ballad of Cable Hogue (1970), directed by Sam Peckinpah. In addition to appearing with James Arness in 14 episodes of Gunsmoke, he was in two episodes of Arness' subsequent western series How the West Was Won (1976–79) and in two episodes of Arness' subsequent police detective series McClain's Law (1981–1982).

His other notable silver screen turns include the investigating State Trooper in I Saw What You Did (1965), the Chief Engineer in The Poseidon Adventure (1972), Callahan in The Towering Inferno (1974), and as Brian Deering in The Boogens (1981).

Crawford died from a stroke eight days past his 90th birthday. According to Variety, he died in Newbury Park, California and was survived by his longtime companion and former wife, Ann Wakefield.

Selected filmography

 Thoroughbreds (1944) - (uncredited)
 The Phantom of 42nd Street (1945) - John Carraby
 Without Reservations (1946) - Soldier (uncredited)
 The Time of Their Lives (1946) - Dandy at Party (uncredited)
 G-Men Never Forget (1948, Serial) - Duke - Dictaphone Boobytrap Thug [Ch. 5] (uncredited)
 Dangers of the Canadian Mounted (1948) - Danton - Henchman
 Sons of Adventure (1948) - George Norton - Cameraman
 Adventures of Frank and Jesse James (1948) - Amos Ramsey
 Ghost of Zorro (1949, Serial) - Mulvaney - Ch. 3, 4
 The James Brothers of Missouri (1949) - Mr. Carson (uncredited)
 Radar Patrol vs. Spy King (1949, Serial) - Sands [Chs. 7-8]
 Chain Lightning (1950) - Radio Operator (uncredited)
 The Invisible Monster (1950) - Harris
 The Asphalt Jungle (1950) - Reporter (uncredited)
 Mystery Street (1950) - Reporter (uncredited)
 Lonely Heart Bandits (1950) - Stevedore
 Union Station (1950) - Hackett (uncredited)
 A Life of Her Own (1950) - Photographer (uncredited)
 Right Cross (1950) - Photographer (uncredited)
 Cyrano de Bergerac (1950) - Cadet
 Cuban Fireball (1951) - Photographer (uncredited)
 Raton Pass (1951) - Sam
 I Was a Communist for the FBI (1951) - FBI Agent McGowan (uncredited)
 Hollywood Story (1951) - 1st Detective (uncredited)
 Show Boat (1951) - Hotel Clerk (uncredited)
 The Red Badge of Courage (1951) - Soldier (uncredited)
 Honeychile (1951) - Marvin McKay
 Man in the Saddle (1951) - Isham Rider (uncredited)
 Northwest Territory (1951) - LeBeau
 The Greatest Show on Earth (1952) - Jack - Circus Attendant (uncredited)
 Scaramouche (1952) - Vignon (uncredited)
 Actor's and Sin (1952) - Movie Hero (segment "Woman of Sin")
 Zombies of the Stratosphere (1952) - Roth
 Blackhawk: Fearless Champion of Freedom (1952) - Chuck
 Old Oklahoma Plains (1952) - Chuck Ramsey
 The Ring (1952) - Cop in Diner (uncredited)
 Son of Geronimo: Apache Avenger (1952, Serial) - Ace Devlin [Chs.1-9]
 Invasion U.S.A. (1952) - Man in Bar (uncredited)
 Stop, You're Killing Me (1952) - State Trooper (uncredited)
 Star of Texas (1953) - Texas Ranger Stockton
 Marshal of Cedar Rock (1953) - Chris Peters - Henchman
 Salome (1953) - Guard (uncredited)
 Serpent of the Nile (1953) - Captain Domitius
 Rebel City (1953) - Joe Spencer
 Mission Over Korea (1953) - Tech Sergeant (uncredited)
 Conquest of Cochise (1953) - Capt. Bill Lawson (uncredited)
 The Great Adventures of Captain Kidd (1953, Serial) - Capt. Kidd [Chs. 1-13]
 The Big Heat (1953) - Al - Bannion's Brother-in-Law (uncredited)
 Slaves of Babylon (1953) - Avil - Belshazzar's Chief Soldier
 Prisoners of the Casbah (1953) - Guard (uncredited)
 Three Sailors and a Girl (1953) - Shore Patrolman (uncredited)
 Man Crazy (1953) - Farmer
 Trader Tom of the China Seas (1954) - Bill Gaines
 The Battle of Rogue River (1954) - Capt. Richard Hillman
 Jesse James vs. the Daltons (1954) - Gang Member (uncredited)
 Captain Kidd and the Slave Girl (1954) - Bonnett
 The Key (1958) - American Captain
 Blind Spot (1958) - Doctor
 Orders to Kill (1958) - Maj. Kimball
 Intent to Kill (1958) - Boyd
 Floods of Fear (1958) - Jack Murphy
 John Paul Jones (1959) - George Washington
 Solomon and Sheba (1959) - Joab
 Hell Is a City (1960) - Don Starling
 I Aim at the Stars (1960) - Dr. Bosco - White Sands, New Mexico
 Piccadilly Third Stop (1960) - Joe Preedy
 The Man Who Was Nobody (1960) - South Africa Smith
 Exodus (1960) - Captain Hank Schlosberg
 The Impersonator (1961) - Sgt. Jimmy Bradford
 The Long Shadow (1961) - Kelly
 The 300 Spartans (1962) - Agathon the Spartan Spy
 The Longest Day (1962) - Col. Caffey (uncredited)
 Come Fly with Me (1963) - Co-Pilot
 Captain Sindbad (1963) - Aram
 Jason and the Argonauts (1963) - Polydeuces (uncredited)
 The Victors (1963) - U.S. Army Captain at rest area
 The Americanization of Emily (1964) - Chief Petty Officer Paul Adams
 The Greatest Story Ever Told (1965) - Alexander
 I Saw What You Did (1965) - State Trooper
 Duel at Diablo (1966) - Clay Dean
 Return of the Gunfighter (1967) - Butch Cassidy
 The Ravine (1969) - Captain Keller
 J. W. Coop (1971) - Rancher
 The Waltons (1972-1981) TV Series - Sheriff Ep Bridges
 Napoleon and Samantha (1972) - Desk Sergeant
 Trouble Man (1972) - Sergeant Koeppler
 The Poseidon Adventure (1972) - Chief Engineer
 The Severed Arm (1973) - Doctor Ray Sanders
 The Towering Inferno (1974) - Callahan
 Night Moves (1975) - Tom Iverson
 The Enforcer (1976) - The Mayor
 Outlaw Blues (1977) - Buzz Cavenaugh
 Tilt (1979) - Mickey 
 Hollywood Knight (1979) - Josh
 Dreamer (1979) - Riverboat Captain
 The Apple Dumpling Gang Rides Again (1979) - Captain Sherick
 Elvis and the Beauty Queen (1981) - Vernon Presley
 The Boogens (1981) - Brian Deering
 The Other Victim (1981)
 McClain's Law (1981) - Salvi
 Yak's Best Ride (1984) - Director
 Grave Secrets (1989) - Homer

References

External links
 
 
 
 
 John Crawford at the University of Wisconsin's Actors Studio audio collection

1920 births
2010 deaths
American male film actors
Male actors from Washington (state)
People from Colfax, Washington